The 1977 Japanese Grand Prix was a Formula One motor race held on 23 October 1977 at Fuji. It was the 17th and final race of the 1977 Formula One World Championship. At the time, this was the last Japanese Grand Prix due to traveling and financial issues (in those days, in order to get to Japan from Europe required going through Anchorage, Alaska in the United States or through Hong Kong, as both the Soviet Union and Red China banned Western aircraft from flying in their airspace) and safety concerns with the Mount Fuji  circuit, it was also the last Japanese Grand Prix to be held at Fuji Speedway until 2007. The race would return in 1987, held at the better spectated and safer Suzuka Circuit.

Report
Mario Andretti and James Hunt continued their late-season battle, with the American pipping Hunt to the pole, with John Watson heading the second row. Hunt took the lead at the start, and Jody Scheckter and Jochen Mass jumped up to second and third, whereas Andretti had a terrible start and was at the tail of the top ten. On the second lap, Andretti was involved in a collision while trying to gain places, putting him out with Binder and Takahara. With Andretti out, Hunt had no challengers left and he built a large gap, with teammate Mass second and Watson passing Scheckter for third. However, both Mass and Watson had to retire within one lap of each other with engine and gearbox failures, and with Scheckter dropping back, Carlos Reutemann was second until he was passed by Jacques Laffite. Hunt went on and capped off the season with a comfortable win, whereas Laffite ran of fuel on the last lap, handing over second to Reutemann and allowing Patrick Depailler to complete the podium.

A marshal and photographer were killed by debris following a collision involving Gilles Villeneuve's Ferrari and Ronnie Peterson's Tyrrell P34 on lap six. They had both been standing in a prohibited area of the track when the accident occurred.  The marshal was trying to clear spectators away from the area.

After the race concluded, both Hunt and Reutemann left the circuit immediately to catch a flight home, leaving Depailler and his engineer on the podium. Rules changed shortly thereafter making the podium celebration mandatory.

March's driver Ian Scheckter was denied entry into and expelled from Japan due to only having a tourist visa passport (unlike his brother Jody Scheckter, who had a working visa) and Japanese objections to the South African apartheid regime.

Classification

Qualifying

Race

Championship standings after the race

Drivers' Championship standings

Constructors' Championship standings

References

Japanese Grand Prix
Grand Prix
Japanese Grand Prix
October 1977 sports events in Asia